The Surrogate Woman (also known as The Surrogate Womb or The Surrogate Mother) is a 1986 film directed by Im Kwon-taek, dealing with the love affair between a rich aristocrat and a poor servant during the Joseon Dynasty.

The film won multiple accolades at the 1987 Asian Film Festival, including Best Film, Best Director, Best Actress, and Best Supporting Actress. Lead actress Kang Soo-yeon was widely acclaimed in her role as the surrogate mother, for which she won Best Actress at the 1987 Venice Film Festival.

Plot
Shin, a nobleman, has been trying to conceive a male heir to continue his family name. Unable to provide a male heir, Shin's wife gives her husband permission to search for a surrogate wife to bear a male heir. On the way to finding a surrogate wife, Shin runs into a 17-year-old girl, Ok-nyo (Kang Soo-yeon). She is a poor, but feisty, girl who states that she will do anything for money. The stubborn nature of Ok-nyo attracts Shin and influences him to choose her to become the mother of his child. Ok-nyo holds the social status of a servant, but the relationship changes both of them through the course of the movie. Ok-nyo has to obey rules which keep her hidden during the day and delegates her to perform the mating ritual during Shins wife's hours of choosing. No matter what is happening, Ok-nyo can not leave the building in which she is housed. With Shin's infatuation and Ok-nyo's attachment, both secretly meet for passionate affairs. Unfortunately both eventually get caught, which causes their separation. Ok-nyo's mother tries to dissuade her, and to break off the relationship, by telling her the realities of life. Even though both are punished for the infraction, they still continue to meet. Eventually Ok-nyo conceives an heir for Shin, but is burdened with not knowing whether Shin will stay by her side or leave with her child forever.

Remake
The film inspired 1989 Malayalam film Dasharatham.

References

External links

Films directed by Im Kwon-taek
1980s Korean-language films
South Korean drama films
Films set in the Joseon dynasty
Teenage pregnancy in film
Films about surrogacy